Nýey, Nýeyjar , Nyø (Danish), was an island that formed in 1783 due to an underwater eruption in the Mid-Atlantic Ridge southwest of Reykjanes, Iceland. It disappeared within a year.

History
The formation of "Nýeyjar" began on May 1, 1783. It attracted a lot of attention and some connected it to the 1783 Calabrian earthquakes. 

The captain of a 'small ship' (":is: húkkerta") that sailed in the area, wrote in his diary about a burning island  due southwest of Geirfuglasker. He tried to observe it but had to stay over half a mile away, due to the poisonous sulphurous smoke. 

King Christian VII of Denmark named the island "Nýey", ordered an expedition to it, and dedicated it to the monarchy with a Danish flag. He also planned for an inscribed stone to be placed on the island. 

It had disappeared by the summer of 1784, when Magnús Stephensen (Lawyer and Supreme Court Judge), planned to dedicate it to the king whilst en route to Copenhagen.

See also
 Eldeyjarboði a nearby eruptive skerry on the same ridge.
 List of volcanic eruptions in Iceland
 Volcanism of Iceland
 Geology of Iceland
 List of volcanoes in Iceland
 Geological deformation of Iceland

Sources
 Vísindavefurinn : " How common are new islands in eruptions? “ (Vísindavefurinn|5044|Hversu algengt er að nýjar eyjar verði til í eldgosum?)

References

Ephemeral islands
Islands of Iceland
Mid-Atlantic Ridge
Southwest Iceland
Uninhabited islands of Iceland